Meet Sexton Blake! is a 1945 British supporting feature drama film directed by John Harlow and starring David Farrar, Manning Whiley, Dennis Arundell, and John Varley. It was one of two films in which David Farrar played Sexton Blake, the other being The Echo Murders (1945), both directed by John Harlow. Important documents are stolen from a dead man during an air raid, and the War Office call in Sexton Blake to investigate.

Cast
 David Farrar as Sexton Blake
 Manning Whiley as Raoul Sudd
 Dennis Arundell as Johann Sudd
 John Varley as Tinker
 Betty Huntley-Wright as Nobby
 Gordon McLeod as Inspector Venner
 Kathleen Harrison as Mrs Bardell
 Cyril Smith as Belford
 Magda Kun as Yvonne
 Ferdy Mayne as Slant-Eyes
 Charles Farrell as Skipper
 Roddy Hughes as Ferraby
 Philip Godfrey as James Baird
 Tony Arpino as Torch
 Charles Rolfe as Mario Carloni
 Elsie Wagstaff as Mrs Baird

Critical reception
TV Guide called the film "entertaining in an unintended way", rating it two out of five stars.

References

External links

1945 films
1945 drama films
Films directed by John Harlow
British drama films
British detective films
British black-and-white films
Films based on British novels
Films based on crime novels
Sexton Blake films
Films shot at British National Studios
1940s English-language films
1940s British films